Daniel Roy Parsons is (founding) Director of the Energy and Environment Institute and a Professor of Process Sedimentology at the University of Hull. He is also a visiting professor at the University of Illinois (USA) and Can Tho University (Vietnam). He obtained his PhD at the University of Sheffield in 2004. Parsons is known for his work on flow processes and sediment transport in rivers, coasts and estuaries, and the deep sea. This includes work addressing flood hazard and risk, as well as internationally-leading work detailing turbidity currents and associated hazards in the deep sea. Parsons also researches the leakage and transport of plastics in rivers, coasts and estuaries and as part of the Huxley debate at the 2018 British Science Festival he claimed that the most significant marker for the Anthropocene age may be the fossilisation of plastic debris such as formed in plastiglomerate. Parsons has recently completed a European Research Council Consolidator Award, is presently President of Division for Geomorphology of the European Geosciences Union and a Commissioner on the Yorkshire and Humber Climate Commission, chairing the Research and Evidence Panel.

Awards
 2010: Gordon Warwick Award from the British Society for Geomorphology
 2012: Chandler-Misener Award from the International Association for Great Lakes Research
 2015: Bigsby Medal from The Geological Society of London
 2016: ERC Consolidator Award

Selected publications
 Hackney, C. R., Vasilopoulos, G., Heng, S., Darbari, V., Walker, S., and Parsons, D.R. (2021) Sand mining far outpaces natural supply in a large alluvial river, Earth Surf. Dynam., 9, 1323–1334.
 Hope, J.A., Coco, G., Parsons, D.R. and Thrush, S.F., (2021) Microplastics interact with benthic biostabilization processes. Environmental Research Letters, 16(12), p. 124058.
 Tapoglou, E., Forster, R.M., Dorrell, R.M. and Parsons, D.R., (2021) Machine learning for satellite-based sea-state prediction in an offshore windfarm. Ocean Engineering, 235, p. 109280.
 Darby, S.E., Hackney, C.R., Leyland, J., Kummu, M., Lauri, H., Parsons, D.R., Best, J.L., Nicholas A.P., and Aalto, R. (2016) 'Fluvial Sediment Supply to a Mega-Delta Reduced by Shifting Tropical-Cyclone Activity', Nature, 539, 276–279, doi:10.1038/nature19809.
 Parsons, D.R. et al, in press, 'The Role of Bio-physical Cohesion on Subaqueous Bedform Size', Geophysical Research Letters, February, 2016.
 Malarkey, J., Baas, J.H., Hope, J.A., Aspden, R.J., Parsons, D.R., et al. (2015), 'The Pervasive Role of Biological Cohesion in Bedform Development', Nature Communications, 6, 6257.
 Reesink, A.J.H., Van den Berg, J.H., Parsons, D.R., Amsler, M.L., Best, J.L., Hardy, R.J., Orfeo, O., and Szupiany, R.N. (2015), 'Extremes in Dune Preservation: Controls on the Completeness of Fluvial Deposits', Earth-Science Reviews, 150, 652-665.
 Schindler, R.J., Parsons, D.R., et al (2015), 'Sticky Stuff: Redefining Bedform Prediction in Modern and Ancient Environments', Geology, 43, 399-402.

References

External links 
https://twitter.com/bedform?lang=en
https://www.researchgate.net/profile/Daniel_Parsons2
https://blogs.egu.eu/divisions/gm/2017/11/09/getting-to-know-the-gm-presidency-candidates-1-dan-parsons/

Living people
Sedimentologists
British geologists
Academics of the University of Hull
Alumni of the University of Sheffield
Year of birth missing (living people)